Ireland competed at the 2017 World Championships in Athletics in London, United Kingdom, from 4–13 August 2017.

Summary
Ireland won no medals at the 2017 championships. Olympic medallist Rob Heffernan finished 8th in the 50 km walk, while Thomas Barr, one of Ireland's main medal hopes in the 400m hurdles, could not compete in the semi-finals due to a norovirus outbreak.

Results
(q – qualified, NM – no mark, SB – season best)

Men
Track and road events

Women
Track and road events

References

Nations at the 2017 World Championships in Athletics
World Championships in Athletics
Ireland at the World Championships in Athletics